Tariq Farooq (born 5 December 1954 in Faisalabad, Pakistan) is a Pakistani and Austrian professional badminton player and coach. He was trained and coached by his father, Mohammad Farooq.

Before taking on the sports career, Tariq Farooq studied Botany, Chemistry and English. In 1975, he obtained his Bachelor of Science degree from the University of the Punjab, in Pakistan.

Soon after that, he joined the National Bank of Pakistan and won 6 times the Team National Championships.

After winning regional, junior, provincial and all Pakistani university titles, in 1981, he also obtained the men's doubles gold medal in the National Badminton Championship in Pakistan.

Tariq Farooq represented the Pakistani National Badminton Team starting 1973 until 1982.

In 1982, he immigrated to Austria and represented the Austrian National Badminton Team during 1983-1995. Altogether, he won 6 national titles and the Europe cup.

Career

Starting with 1973 up until 1995, Tariq Farooq participated in various Badminton events, including Thomas Cup, Sudirman Cup, Plum d'Or Cup, World Championships, European Championships and International Open Championships in many different countries almost all over the world.

Farooq celebrated his first international success in 1977 when he won the men's singles in the Portugal International.

Later on in his career, he also won the men's singles in the Malta International tournament in 1984.

In the same season, Farooq manages to win a second gold medal in the Belgian International.

In 1984 as well, he qualifies for the IBF World Championships in Calgary.

In 1987 Farooq becomes at 33 of age the Austrian state champion. The men's singles title in the Austrian National Championships was his first victory after settling in Austria.

At the European Senior Championships he won the silver medal in 1995, 1997, as well as in 1999, right after the danish badminton player Claus Andersen. In 2003, Farooq finally took home the gold medal of the World Senior Championships in the men's singles 45+ category.

Awards
As a result of his achievements and contributions to the badminton sport in Austria, the Austrian Badminton Federation and the city of Linz honoured Tariq Farooq during his career with several Gold awards.

In 2000, Tariq also received the Meritorious Service Award from the International Badminton Federation (now Badminton World Federation) and the Gold Award from the Upper Austrian Badminton Federation.

Achievements

Coaching
After finishing his Bachelor Studies, Tariq Farooq decided to orient himself more towards coaching and studied Physical Education at the University of the Punjab, in Pakistan. During 1981-1982, he finalized his general and badminton coaching education. 

Soon after settling in Austria in 1982, Tariq started coaching the Austrian National Team up until 1986.

To improve his knowledge of badminton coaching, he attended the International Badminton Federations World Coaching Conferences in 1985, 1987, 1989, 1991, 1995, 1997 and 1999.

Tariq also attended European coaching seminars in 1984, 1986 and 1988.

Starting May 2005 until September 2006, Tariq was National Badminton Coach in Pakistan. 

Starting 25th of February 2006 until 7th of March 2006, he was nominated by the International Badminton Federation as Chief Instructor to conduct the International Olympic committee solidarity coaches clinic in Lahore, Pakistan.

In 2007, Tariq also conducted coaching education clinics in Turkey.

He coached provincial federations players in many badminton clubs in Austria. Between 2007 and 2013 he was coaching national players of the BSC70 club in Linz, Austria, while during 2012-2015 he was also coaching national players of the Badminton Union St. Peter/AU club in Austria.

Tariq Farooq's achievements and contributions led to his election as honorary Sport Chief, National Team Manager and Chief Selector for the Austrian Badminton Federation.

References

Pakistani male badminton players
Austrian male badminton players
1954 births
Living people
Pakistani emigrants to Austria
University of the Punjab alumni